Pavarisa Yoktuan (born: 3 May 1994) is a Thai professional golfer playing on the U.S.-based LPGA Tour.

Early life
Yoktuan was born on 3 May 1994. She started playing golf at the age of 9 years old. Hobbies include watching television series, sleeping and swimming.

Amateur career
Yoktuan competed for Thailand at the 2011 Southeast Asian Games in Indonesia and won a silver medal in women's team event

Professional career
Yoktuan turned professional in 2012. She joined the China LPGA Tour in the following year. At the 2014 Wuhan Challenge, she won her first international title. In December 2015, she finished tied for 32nd at the final stage LPGA Qualifying Tournament to earn LPGA Tour membership for the 2016 season. She played on the Symetra Tour in 2018 season and finished third on the official money list to earn LPGA Tour card for the 2019 season.

In 2019, Yoktuan recorded her career-best LPGA Tour finish with a tied for fifth place in the Marathon Classic. At the 2019 Women's British Open, she secured her best major championship finish with a tied for 29th place.

Amateur wins 
2011 National Team Qualifying 5

Source:

Professional wins (4)

China LPGA Tour wins (1)
2014 (1) Wuhan Challenge

Thai LPGA Tour wins (3) 
 2013 (1) 6th Singha-SAT Thai LPGA Championship
 2014 (1) 5th Singha-SAT Thai LPGA Championship
 2015 (1) 1st Singha-SAT Thai LPGA Championship

Results in LPGA majors 
Results not in chronological order before 2019

CUT = missed the half-way cut
"T" = tied

Team appearances
Espirito Santo Trophy (representing Thailand): 2008
Southeast Asian Games (representing Thailand): 2011

References

External links

Pavarisa Yoktuan
LPGA Tour golfers
Pavarisa Yoktuan
Southeast Asian Games medalists in golf
Competitors at the 2011 Southeast Asian Games
Pavarisa Yoktuan
1994 births
Living people
Pavarisa Yoktuan